Crooked Lake Township is a township in Cass County, Minnesota, United States. The population was 498 as of the 2000 census. It is named after Roosevelt Lake, formerly known as Crooked Lake, a large lake located in this township. Crooked Lake is a translation from the Ojibwe Wewaagigamaag-zaaga'igan.

Geography

Unincorporated communities
 Outing

Major highway
  Minnesota State Highway 6

Lakes
 Abe Lake
 Andrus Lake
 Bear Lake
 Blue Bill Lake
 Donut Lake
 East Wood Lake
 Grasshopper Lake
 Lawrence Lake
 Lake George (east three-quarters)
 Lake Leavitt (west half)
 Margaret Lake
 Marion Lake
 Mule Lake
 Oxbox Lake (west three-quarters)
 Pavelgrit Lake
 Roosevelt Lake
 Smoky Hollow Lake
 Snake Lake
 Snowshoe Lake
 State Lake
 West Wood Lake
 Washburn Lake (vast majority)
 Wood Lake
 Woods Lake
 Wren Lake (west edge)

Adjacent townships
 Thunder Lake Township (north)
 Smoky Hollow Township (northeast)
 Beulah Township (east)
 Little Pine Township, Crow Wing County (southeast)
 Trelipe Township (west)

Demographics
As of the census of 2000, there were 498 people, 249 households, and 164 families residing in the township. The population density was 16.6 people per square mile (6.4/km2). The racial makeup of the township was 98.39% White, 0.60% Native American, 0.20% Asian, and 0.80% from two or more races. Hispanic or Latino of any race were 0.40% of the population.

There were 249 households, out of which 12.4% had children under the age of 18 living with them, 63.9% were married couples living together, 0.8% had a female householder with no husband present, and 34.1% were non-families. 30.1% of all households were made up of individuals, and 15.7% had someone living alone who was 65 years of age or older.  The average household size was 2.00 and the average family size was 2.45.

In the township the population was spread out, with 13.1% under the age of 18, 2.4% from 18 to 24, 14.1% from 25 to 44, 39.0% from 45 to 64, and 31.5% who were 65 years of age or older.  The median age was 57 years. For every 100 females, there were 124.3 males.  For every 100 females age 18 and over, there were 116.5 males.

The median income for a household in the township was $32,708, and the median income for a family was $40,625. Males had a median income of $35,833 versus $16,563 for females. The per capita income for the township was $21,294.  About 2.1% of families and 6.3% of the population were below the poverty line, including none of those under age 18 and 6.1% of those age 65 or over.

References
 United States National Atlas
 United States Census Bureau 2007 TIGER/Line Shapefiles
 United States Board on Geographic Names (GNIS)

Townships in Cass County, Minnesota
Brainerd, Minnesota micropolitan area
Townships in Minnesota